Bačevići is a populated settlement in the Mostar municipality, just south of the city of Mostar, Bosnia and Herzegovina, making it a suburb.

Demographics 
According to the 2013 census, its population was 492.

References

Populated places in Mostar
Villages in the Federation of Bosnia and Herzegovina